Crosnierita is a genus of squat lobsters in the family Munididae, containing the following species:
 Crosnierita adela Ahyong, Taylor & McCallum, 2013
 Crosnierita dicata Macpherson, 1998
 Crosnierita tucanae Macpherson, 2004
 Crosnierita urizae (Macpherson, 1994)
 Crosnierita yante (Macpherson, 1994)

References

External links

Squat lobsters